LaCale London (born August 5, 1997) is an American football defensive tackle for the St. Louis BattleHawks of the XFL.

Early life and education
LaCale London was born on August 5, 1997, in Peoria, Illinois. He attended Peoria High School there, earning all-conference and defensive player of the year honors. After graduating, London spent one year at Iowa Central Community College, playing in six games as a freshman and recording 32 tackles. He also made six quarterback sacks.

London later transferred to Western Illinois University, playing in all eleven games in 2018. He recorded 23 tackles and 3.5 sacks, earning him a place on the MVCF All-Newcomer team. As a senior in 2019, London started all twelve games and tied for second in the MVCF with three forced fumbles. He totaled 45 tackles, earning him second-team All-MVCF honors by Phil Steele.

Professional career

Chicago Bears 
After going unselected in the 2020 NFL Draft, London was signed by the Chicago Bears as an undrafted free agent. He was released at roster cuts but later re-signed to the practice squad. He spent the entire  season on the practice squad, and did not see any playing time.

London was placed on injured reserve to start the  season, but was released with an injury settlement on September 8. He was re-signed to the practice squad on November 2, and activated in December. He made his NFL debut on December 20, playing on one snap in a loss versus the Minnesota Vikings. He signed a reserve/future contract with the Bears on January 11, 2022. He was waived on August 23, 2022.

St. Louis BattleHawks 
On November 17, 2022, London was drafted by the St. Louis BattleHawks of the XFL.

References

1997 births
Living people
Players of American football from Illinois
American football defensive tackles
Iowa Central Tritons football players
Western Illinois Leathernecks football players
Chicago Bears players
St. Louis BattleHawks players
Sportspeople from Peoria, Illinois